Mix Master: Final Force is a co-produced animated series based on the Mix Master franchise. Produced by Sunwoo Entertainment in Korea and their Singaporean Asia Pacific branch, the series aired for 39 episodes on KBS2 between May 26, 2010 and March 16, 2011.

The series was initially represented by Studio Licensing in North America. It was then picked up by Splash Entertainment and like the first season, made available on Kabillion in March 2017. Final Force's English version was recorded at Soundworks in Burbank, California.

Story
In this story, Ditt forgets that he was a Mix Master. But when the time comes to save the world once again, he finds new friends to help him in his battle against Eva and Babel, the two new antagonists. After the battle, Ditt and his friends meet the true antagonist of the season, Red Knight. They find out that Red Knight was once a hero who couldn't resist the taste of power and decided to enslave henches to get more power. He ended up being enslaved by his own core force. When Ditt and his comrades finally defeated him they thought it was over but they had to deal with another big threat: Red Knight had a friend called Blue Fox, also mad due to his mad quest for power. He is trying to obtain the Dark Mix Masters.

Cast
 Dorothy Fahn : Ditt
 Doug Erholtz : Ray
 Michelle Ruff : Aring
 Stephanie Sheh : Moreen
 Heather Downey : Chichi
 Philece Sampler : Mir
 Jessica Straus : ANGANG / Eva / Root
 Donn A. Nordean: Ninom / Blue Fox
 Patrick Seitz: Babel / Wolfman
 Edgar Recinos: Red Knight
 Sal Romeo : Grand Pung
 Marlo P. Flanagan: Pazzi
 Steve Kramer : Kayon

Additional Cast

 Akhil Conner
 Alison MacCarley
 Andrea Veneziao
 Anna Garduño
 Barbara Brown
 Barbara Goodson
 Bobby Thong
 Cindy Robinson
 Cristina Vee
 Danielle Judovitz
 Dave Mallow
 David Lodge
 David Veneziano
 Donald Miles
 Doug Stone
 Erik Scott Kimerer
 Gus DeBair
 Hillary Balk
 Jacob Craner
 Melissa Fahn
 Micah St. Hilaire
 Michael Bybee
 Michael Dale Brown
 Michael Sinterniklaas
 Michael Sorich
 Mike Davis
 Mille Oliver
 Mitchel Young Evans
 Mona Marshall
 Murray Blue
 Nicholas Apostolina
 Peter Anderson
 Peter Lurie
 Randall Montgomory
 Richard Smallberrie
 Robert Duncan
 Robert Mark
 Sam Regal
 Mark Allen Jr.
 William Steinberg
 Marc Handler
 Marlene Sharp
 Will Churchill
 Laura Gerow
 Tony Salvatore
 Tony Oliver
 Kyle Hebert
 Kirk Thornton
 Tomoko Shimomura
 Tara Platt
 Julia Abelew
 Jacquelyn Raffle
 Stephanie Misa
 Jr.Jillian Blaine
 James Mastroianni
 KleinSpike Spencer
 Sarah Williams

Crew
 Produced by: Sunwoo Entertainment Co., Ltd., Sunwoo Asia Pacific Pte. Ltd.
 Executive Producers: Han-Young Kang, Moon-Ju Kang
 Producer: Mi-Kyung Kim
 Directed by: Oh-Hyun Kwon
 Written by: Kyung-Hee Chang, Hyung-Joo Kim, Chung-Bok Lee, Hee-Yeon Kim, Oh-Hyun Kwon, Jee-Hyun Song
 Line Producers: Jong-Yoon Yoon, Gab-Hee Han
 English Language Producer / Voice Director: Marc Handler
 Executive Story Editor / English Language Script Writer: Marc Handler
 Script Coordinator / Casting Director: Deborah Crane
 Audio Post Production Services-English Language: Soundworks, Burbank, CA (Jeff Sheridan, Dabid Veneziano)
 Recording Supervisor: Jeff Sheridan
 Recording Engineer: Dan Montes, Jacob Craner, Patrick Bell
 English Opening & Closing Theme Songs Produced by: John Majkut & Marc Handler
 English Lyrics by: Marc Handler
 Opening Theme Song English Vocalist: John Majkut
 Closing Theme Song English Vocalist: Cindy Robinson
 Art Director: Young-Woon Lee
 Character Design: Jong-Ho Lee, Jin-Hyun Jeon, Hyun-soo We, Eun-Jung Lee
 Background Design: Min-Hee Son, Myung-Shin Goo, Hyung-Joon Cha, Jin-Cheol Gil, Kyung-Ja Kim
 Mechanic Design: Cheol Sung, Cheoul-woo Jung, Dong-Ho Sung
 Prop Design: Won-Hee Choi, Hae-Sun Jung
 Color Design: Min-A Lee
 Character Supervisors: Jong-Gi Choi, Eun-Joo Cho
 Storyboards by: Baek-Yeop Sung, Chung-Bok Lee, Jong-Kyung Lee, Seung-Jin Bang, Heon-Pyo Hong, Sung-Cheol Go, Gi-du Kim, Hong-Soo Joo, Seung-Hyun Jo, Seung-Hyun Go, Sung-Dae Kim
 Layout Supervisors: Hyun-Geun Chang, Seok-Hee Seo, Jong-Yong Kim, Jong-Kyung Lee, Moon-Yeong Lim, Sang-Won Woo, Seong-Beom Kim, Hyung-Geun Chang, Bong-Hyun Yu, Gi-Nam Kim, Young-Hoon Han, Gi-Doo Lee, Si-Yun Park
 Key-Animation Supervisors: Jong-Jun Park, Eun-Joo Cho, Sang-Hoon Cha, Dong-Gyun Ryu, Mi-Yung Cheong, Dong-Ik Lee, Seong-Beom Kim, Eun-Soo Oh, Min-Bae Lee, Yong-Joo Kim, Jung-Ha Seo, Soo-Il Yun, Jeon-Jong Lee, Gang-Yun Kim, Hyun-Jo Ha, Hyo-Kyung Lim, Jin-Uk Lim, Sang-Li Kim
 Animation Supervisors: Kyung-Sook Cheon, Sung-Kwon Kang, Sung-Jin Lee
 Background Supervisors: Yun-Ho Lee, Seung-Chan Kang, Sang-Woon Kim
 Layout & Key Animation: Dae-Ryong Kang, Joon-Kyung Chang, Yong-Joo Kim, Eun-Soo Oh, Jin-Gwang Kim, Chang-Seop Shin, Deok-joo Ha, Deok-Ho Lee, Ji-Hee Jung, Yung-Hee Choi, Jae-Wook Lee, Ki-Cheol Na
 Animation: Bo-mi Kim, Yu-Young Kim, Deok-Jin Yang, Ga-Ram Won, Mi-Sun Lee, Hyun-ok Lee, Eun-Hee Jung, Young-Shin Cho, Sung-Woo Choi, Jung-Soon Choi, Jung-Ok Choi, Ji-Yeon Choi, Shin-Ae Ham
 Color Key: Mi-Hyun Ahn, Mi-Ae Na, Sun-A Yang, Soon-Nam Kim, Nam-Hee Kim
 Final Check: Young-Ran Cho, Young-Ra Cho, Ha-Yeon Lee, Moon-Yeong Lim
 Ink & Paint: Eun-Hee Kim, Soo-Jung Kim, Jin-Kyung Kim, Tae-Hee Kim, Hee-Jung Kim, Moon-Hee Na, Jung-Hwa Min, In-Sook Shim, Sun-Hee Yang, In-Sook Yang, So-Young Yeo, Moon-Seop Lee, Jung-Hye Lee, Sook-Ja Yeon, Yun-Hee Jung, Sun-Ok Cho, Jin-Young Han, Mi-Ae Heo, Soo-Jin Hwang, Ji-Young Hwang, Hye-Jin Cho, Shin-Hye Yun, Kyung-Mi Kim, Hye-Sook Hwang, Min-Seol Kim
 Backgrounds: Young-Bae Lee, Ji-Seong Lee, Hwa-Jin Cho, Sang-Gyu Bae, Sang Hyeop Nam, Go-Eun Lee, Hye-Mi Yun, Shin-Ha Park, A-Ra Kang, Jericho Ebardo Benavente, Aristotie Bagay Landayan, Carlo Lirazan Pujeda, Dexter Jimena Abdamin, Henry Felicano Du, Oliver Barruela Orap-orap, Emmanuel Angeles Villaverde
 3D Supervisor: Suk-Bum Lee, Dae-Il Kang
 3D Animation: Jung-Whun Bang, Byung-Kwon Jung, Seong-Gyu Cho, Jung-Seop Lee, Jong-Min Lim, Won-Kyung Song, Jong-Hyeok Eom
 Modeling: Young-Man Kim, Pil-Young Lee, Jeoung-Do Seo
 Rigging: Jung-Whun Bang, Pil-Young Lee, Young-Man Kim
 Lighting: Young-Man Kim
 Texture: Young-Man Kim, Seok-Gi Kim
 Camera Supervisor: Oh-Joon Kwon
 Camera: Hyun-Heum Park, Hee-Jin Kang, Bok-Hyun Jung, Chang-Min Oh, Kyung-Soo Choi, Ji-Hoon Hyun, Eun-Sil Lee, Gwang-Hee Lee, Young-yun Go, Mi-Kyung Lee, Woo-Sung Hwang, Jong-Sun Ha
 Music Composed by: Jea-Kwang Yoo
 Post Production Sound Effect Services: Soo-Yeon Cho, Seung-Hee Go
 Chief Production Coordinators: Seong-Jin Seo, Moon-Young Lim
 Coordinators: Eun-Yung Nam, Joon-Sun Lee, Jee-Hyun Song, In-Hyung Cho, Eun-Hye Ahn
 English Coordinator: Oh-Sung Kwon
 Marketing: Jun-so Jeon, Soo-Hee Seong
 Overseas Marketing: Jun-Bok Lee, Yeong-Taek Son, Sook-Hui Choi
 Marketing Design: Tae-Seong Park, Hae-Jung Chang
 Mechanic Design Support: Byung-Yun Choi, Won-Kyun Cho
 System Administrator: Jung-Myung Park
 Editor: Jae-Woo Seo
 Business Management Support: Shin-Hwan Lee, Sung-Il Yun, Hyo-Sang Nam, Saemina Choi, Ji-Hye Shin
 Materials Management: Yang-Eun Lee
 Trade Insurance Supported by: Korea Trade Insurance Corporation
 Overseas Distribution Supported by: Korea Creative Content Agency
 Invested by: Sunwoo Entertainment Co., Ltd., Sunwoo Asia Pacific Pte. Ltd., Stonebridge Capital Inc., Sovik Venture Capital Co., Ltd.
 © Sunwoo / Sunwoo APAC / Stonebridge / Sovic

Episodes

See also 
aeni

References

External links
KBS Mix Master Homepage
Sunwoo Entertainment Mix Master Homepage

2010 South Korean television series debuts
2011 South Korean television series endings
2010s South Korean animated television series
2010s Singaporean television series
Singaporean animated television series
South Korean children's animated action television series
South Korean children's animated adventure television series
South Korean children's animated fantasy television series
Animated television series about children
Card games in anime and manga